Rigor mortis is one of the recognizable signs of death.

Rigor mortis also may refer to:
 Rigor Mortis (film), 2013, by Juno Mak
 Rigor Mortis (radio), 2003-2006 BBC Radio 4 comedy series
 Musical contexts:
 Rigor Mortis (band), thrash-metal band
 Titled works:
"Rigor Mortis" (song), 1977, by Cameo
 Albums:
 Rigor Mortis (album), 1988 by the band
 De RigueurMortis 2001 album by Australian band TISM